The Tooth fairy is a mythical creature who gives out money in exchange for teeth.

Tooth Fairy may also refer to:

Fictional entities
The Tooth Fairy, alias of Francis Dolarhyde, a fictional serial killer in Thomas Harris' novel Red Dragon
 Tooth Fairy, a character from Rise of the Guardians
 Tooth Fairy, a character from The Fairly OddParents

Films
 Tooth Fairy (2001), a short film which inspired Darkness Falls
 Tooth Fairy (2004 film), a 2004 short film
 Tooth Fairy (2010 film), a 2010 comedy film
 Tooth Fairy 2, a direct-to-video 2012 sequel to the Tooth Fairy 2010 film
 The Tooth Fairy (film), a 2006 horror film starring Lochlyn Munro

Literature
 The Tooth Fairy, a 1996 novel by Graham Joyce

Television
Programs
 Tooth Fairy, Where Are You?, a 25-minute, made-for-TV animated short
Tales of the Tooth Fairies
Episodes
 "Tooth Fairy" (Shaun the Sheep), an episode of Shaun the Sheep
 "The Tooth Fairy Tats 2000", an episode of South Park